Qian Xiaoqian (born November 1955) is a Chinese politician.

He is a representative of the 19th National Congress of the Chinese Communist Party and a member of the 19th Central Committee of the Chinese Communist Party. He is a member of the 13th National Committee of the Chinese People's Political Consultative Conference.

Biography
Qian was born in Qidong County, Jiangsu, in November 1955. During the Cultural Revolution, he worked at Shanghai Outpost Farm and then Shanghai Farm Administration from December 1973 to July 1978.

He joined the Chinese Communist Party (CCP) in October 1974, and entered the Statistics Bureau of Shanghai Municipal Planning Commission and Shanghai Municipal Price Bureau in July 1978. 

In 1979, he was admitted to the Renmin University of China, majoring in history. After university in 1983, he was assigned to the Theoretical Bureau of the Propaganda Department of the Chinese Communist Party. He worked in the Information Office of the State Council between December 1991 and April 2013, what he was promoted to its deputy director in February 2004. He also served as deputy director of the Cyberspace Administration of China from May 2011 to April 2013. He became deputy party branch secretary of China Writers Association in April 2013, rising to party branch secretary the next year.
 He concurrently served as vice chairman of China Writers Association from December 2016 to September 2021. In September 2021, he was appointed vice chairperson of the Culture, History and Study Committee of the National Committee of the Chinese People's Political Consultative Conference.

References

1955 births
Living people
People from Qidong County
Renmin University of China alumni
People's Republic of China politicians from Jiangsu
Chinese Communist Party politicians from Jiangsu
Members of the 19th Central Committee of the Chinese Communist Party
Members of the 13th Chinese People's Political Consultative Conference